The 74th (Yeomanry) Division was a Territorial Force infantry division formed in Palestine in early 1917 from three dismounted yeomanry brigades. It served in the Sinai and Palestine Campaign of the First World War, mostly as part of XX Corps. In May 1918 it was sent to the Western Front where it remained until the end of the war.

The division's insignia was a broken spur to signify that its units were once mounted but now served as infantry.

History

Formation
On 14 January 1917, Egyptian Expeditionary Force (EEF) Order No. 26 instructed that the 2nd, 3rd and 4th Dismounted Brigades (then with the Suez Canal Defences) be reorganized as the 229th, 230th and 231st Brigades.

On 23 February 1917, Lieutenant General Sir Archibald Murray, the General Officer Commanding EEF, sought permission from the War Office to form the 229th, 230th and 231st Brigades into a new division. On 25 February, the War Office granted permission and the new 74th (Yeomanry) Division started to form. It was acknowledged that it would take some time for artillery, engineers and auxiliary services to complete the division.

The division began to assemble from 4 March at el Arish. The 229th Brigade joined at el Arish by 9 March, the 231st Brigade joined at Khan Yunis by 6 April and the 230th Brigade joined by 13 April at Deir el Balah. The other divisional units (cavalry squadron, engineer field companies, veterinary section, and the train), had joined by April. The artillery did not become a part of the division until July and August (after the division had already fought in the Second Battle of Gaza).

Palestine 1917–18
The 74th Division took part in the invasion of Palestine in 1917 and 1918.

The division was not fully formed when it participated in the Second Battle of Gaza between 17 and 19 April 1917. It acted as reserve to the Eastern Force and was not engaged. Thereafter, the division was assigned to XX Corps where it remained for the rest of its time in Palestine.

In October and November 1917, the division took part in the Third Battle of Gaza (including the capture of Beersheba on 31 October and the Sheria Position on 6 November). At the end of 1917, it took part in the capture and defence of Jerusalem and in March 1918 in the Battle of Tell 'Asur. On 3 April 1918, the division was warned that it would move to France and by 30 April 1918 had completed embarkation at Alexandria.

Before departure for France, the 4th (of 229th Brigade), 209th (of 230th Brigade), 210th (of 231st Brigade) and 261st MG Companies formed 74th Battalion, Machine Gun Corps. It concentrated at Alexandria between 17 and 30 April and departed for France with the division on the latter date.

The artillery was also restructured in March and April 1918 before departing for France. On 21 March, 'A' Battery of CCLXVIII Brigade, RFA (A/CCLXVIII) returned to 60th (2/2nd London) Division where it resumed its original identity as B/CCCI. It was replaced by 425 Battery which was redesignated A/CCLXVIII.  Then, between 11 and 21 April, the artillery was reorganized as two brigades at Lydda:

Each brigade now consisted of three batteries of six 18-pounders and a battery of four 4.5" howitzers. Each of the howitzer batteries were later made up to six 4.5" howitzers in France (on 21 May 1918 at Noulette).

France and Flanders 1918
In May 1918, the 74th (Yeomanry) Division landed at Marseilles, France. It served in France and Flanders for the rest of the war. By 18 May, the division had concentrated around Rue in the Abbeville area. Here the dismounted Yeomanry underwent training for service on the Western Front, particularly gas defence.

Due to a lack of replacements, British infantry divisions on the Western Front had been reduced from 12 to nine battalions in January and February 1918. To conform with this new structure, on 21 June, 12th Royal Scots Fusiliers (of 229th Brigade), 12th Norfolk Regiment (of 230th Brigade) and 24th Royal Welsh Fusiliers (of 231st Brigade) left the 74th (Yeomanry) Division. They were used to reconstitute 94th Brigade of 31st Division which was renamed the 94th (Yeomanry) Brigade on that date. On 16 May, the Pioneer Battalion, 1/12th Loyal North Lancashire Regiment, was reduced from a 4-company to a 3-company organization.

On 14 July 1918 the 74th (Yeomanry) Division went into the line for the first time, near Merville on the right of XI Corps. From September 1918, as part of III Corps of Fourth Army, it took part in the Hundred Days Offensive including the Second Battle of the Somme (Second Battle of Bapaume) and the Battles of the Hindenburg Line (Battle of Épehy). In October and November 1918, it took part in the 'Final Advance' on Artois and Flanders. By the Armistice it was in the area of Tournai, Belgium.

With the end of the war, the troops of 74th Division were engaged in railway repair work and education was undertaken while demobilisation began. The division and its subformations were disbanded on 10 July 1919.

Commanders
74th (Yeomanry) Division was commanded throughout its existence by Major General E.S. Girdwood.

Battles
 Second Battle of Gaza
 Battle of Beersheba
 Third Battle of Gaza
 Battle of Jerusalem
 Battle of Tell 'Asur
 Second Battle of Bapaume
 Battle of Épehy

See also

 List of British divisions in World War I
 British yeomanry during the First World War

Notes

References

External links
 The British Army in the Great War: The 74th (Yeomanry) Division

Bibliography
 
 
 
 
 }
 
 

Infantry divisions of the British Army in World War I
Military units and formations established in 1917
Military units and formations disestablished in 1919
Yeomanry regiments of the British Army